Pseudomallocera auriflua is a species of beetle in the family Cerambycidae, the only species in the genus Pseudomallocera.

References

Elaphidiini